Willi Kolb (born 18 February 1934) is a German weightlifter. He competed in the men's lightweight event at the 1956 Summer Olympics.

References

1934 births
Living people
German male weightlifters
Olympic weightlifters of the United Team of Germany
Weightlifters at the 1956 Summer Olympics
Place of birth missing (living people)